Hattimuda is a village in Satterjhora Village Development Committee in Sunsari District, Nepal. It is classified as ward no. 2. 

Populated places in Sunsari District